Fred, Frederick or Frederic Marshall may refer to:

Fred Marshall (American politician) (1906–1985), U.S. politician
Fred Marshall (British politician) (1883–1962), British politician

Frederick Marshall (British Army officer) (1829–1900), British general
Frederic Marshall (lawyer) (1839–1910), British barrister
Frederick Marshall (politician) (1902–1975), Australian politician
Frederick J. Marshall (1951-2023), American judge
Frederic William Marshall (1721-1802), administrator and town planner in North Carolina

See also

 Freddie Ray Marshall (born 1928), professor of economics